The Naval Air Establishment Chiang Gae'n was a reconnaissance/trainer seaplane built in China during the early 1930s.

Design
The Chiang Gae'n was a biplane design with provisions for a pilot and observer, intended to serve as either a reconnaissance aircraft or advanced trainer.

Operators

Chinese Navy

References 

1930s Chinese military reconnaissance aircraft
Naval Air Establishment aircraft
Floatplanes
Biplanes